Radiocontrolledrobot is the second studio album released by Johannesburg-based South African Indie rock band The Parlotones under its Sovereign Entertainment label. It was produced by Dave Birch at Tropical Sweat Studios in Durban, South Africa. A shorter version of the album (comprising 12 tracks instead of 18) was released internationally in 2007, making it the first international album released by the band. The album also won the best album of the year at the 2006 South Africa Music Awards.

The first single from the album is "Colourful". The single "Overexposed" was used as the theme song for FHM World's Hottest Woman short film. A TV commercial for Fujifilm in Ireland featured the track "Beautiful".

Track listing

International release

Music videos

 Dragonflies & Astronauts is the second video made by the band. It was made with the help of Claudio Pavan and Fiction Factory. The video took nine months to create and is completely animated.

References

External links
 www.parlotones.co.za
 www.sovent.co.za
 www.sovent.co.za
 www.powerzone.co.za

2005 albums
The Parlotones albums